Rocket's Island is a British television series, created by Nick Leather about a family taking care of foster children. It stars Jordan Benjamin, Samuel Bottomley, Jack Hartley, Tom Coliandris, Helen Daniels and Joe Gallucci. It was produced by Lime Pictures and All3Media for CBBC.

It was nominated for a BAFTA children's award in the drama category in 2016, but lost out to the winner Refugee. Rocket's Island has never been released on DVD.

Plot
Rocket's Island is about the Boulsworth family, who live at and run Knot Farm, who take care of a number of foster children who come and stay with them. Rocket and his friends have many adventures in their day-to-day lives with plenty of drama involved.

Cast
 Joe Gallucci as Rocket Boulsworth
 Helen Daniels as Alli Boulsworth
 Jordan Benjamin as Dibber Sparks 
 Samuel Bottomley as Brandon Keleher 
 Sydney Wade as Jade Hollis
 Kit Connor as Archie Beckles
 Natasha Joseph as Sarah Boulsworth
 Mark Jordon as Peter Boulsworth
 Tom Gilling as PC Gerry Beddoe
 William Hall as Jonathan Healey
 Tom Coliandris as Lucas Summer 
 Leisa Gwenllian as Bethany Summer
 Isaac Rouse as Ben/Barney Bean
 Jack Hartley as Tyler McCray
 Gia O'Meally as Madison Creetch
 Mark Frost	 as Elfyn Summers
 Suzette Llewellyn	as Wendy Sparks
 Ram John Holder as Grandad Sparks

Production
The series was filmed in north Wales, and in part on the Isle of Man.

Episodes

Series 1

Series 2

Series 3

References

External links
 

BBC children's television shows
English-language television shows
Television series by All3Media
2012 British television series debuts
2015 British television series endings
British children's fantasy television series